Patrick O'Neill or Patrick O'Neil may refer to:

Patrick O'Neill, 1st Count of Tyrone, 17th century soldier and 1st Count of Tyrone
Patrick O'Neill (politician) (1875–1938), Irish politician and hotel proprietor
Patrick Geoffrey O'Neill (1924–2012), British academic and writer
Patrick O'Neill (handballer) (born 1956), American handball player
Patrick O'Neil (1942–2019), American computer scientist
Patrick O'Neil (footballer) (born 1992), Scottish footballer
J. Patrick O'Neill (born 1971), Rhode Island state representative
Patrick O'Neill (bishop), Irish Roman Catholic bishop
Patrick O'Neill (activist), American Catholic peace activist, one of the Kings Bay Plowshares Seven

See also
 
Pat O'Neill (disambiguation)
Patrick O'Neal (disambiguation)